The sixth and final season of the AMC television series Better Call Saul premiered on April 18, 2022, in the United States, and concluded on August 15, 2022. The thirteen-episode season was broadcast on Mondays at 9:00pm (Eastern) in the United States on AMC and its streaming service AMC+. Each episode was released on Netflix the day after in certain international markets. The season was split into two parts; the first consisting of the first seven  episodes concluded on May 23, 2022, before resuming with the second half consisting of the final six episodes on July 11. Bob Odenkirk, Jonathan Banks, Rhea Seehorn, Patrick Fabian, Michael Mando, Tony Dalton, and Giancarlo Esposito reprise their roles from previous seasons. Better Call Saul is a spin-off, prequel and sequel of Breaking Bad created by Vince Gilligan and Peter Gould.

The sixth season picks up where the fifth left off. The first nine episodes mainly take place in Albuquerque, New Mexico in 2004, four years before Jimmy McGill (Odenkirk) begins his association with meth cooks Walter White (Bryan Cranston) and Jesse Pinkman (Aaron Paul). The season shows the further evolution of Jimmy into the eponymous character, criminal defense lawyer "Saul Goodman", as he and his wife Kim Wexler (Seehorn) execute their plan to ruin the career of Howard Hamlin (Fabian) to force a resolution of the Sandpiper case. Simultaneously, it depicts the drug cartel's reactions to the assassination attempt on Lalo Salamanca (Dalton). The remaining episodes mainly take place in 2010, after the events of Breaking Bad, and show Saul living in Omaha, Nebraska under the alias "Gene Takavic", hiding from the authorities  after the demise of Walter.  

The sixth season was filmed over a period of eleven months in Albuquerque. Upon release, it received universal acclaim from critics, particularly for its performances, writing, visuals, emotional weight, and similarity to Breaking Bad compared to earlier seasons. The first half received four nominations at the 74th Primetime Emmy Awards, including for Outstanding Drama Series while the second half is eligible for next year's Emmys.

Cast and characters

Main 
 Bob Odenkirk as Jimmy McGill / Saul Goodman, a criminal defense attorney practicing under the name Saul Goodman. In the post-Breaking Bad timeline, he manages a Cinnabon store in Omaha under the alias Gene Takavic.
 Jonathan Banks as Mike Ehrmantraut, a fixer in Gus Fring's criminal enterprise who is hunting down Lalo after his attempted assassination.
 Rhea Seehorn as Kim Wexler, a lawyer and Jimmy's wife and confidante.
 Patrick Fabian as Howard Hamlin, managing partner of the Hamlin, Hamlin & McGill law firm.
 Michael Mando as Nacho Varga, a lieutenant in the Salamanca organization who oversees daily operations in Albuquerque. He’s hiding in Mexico due to his involvement in the attempted assassination of Lalo Salamanca.
 Tony Dalton as Lalo Salamanca, acting head of the Salamancas, a family of drug dealers and enforcers for Don Eladio's cartel. He is keeping surveillance of Gus' plans for a secret meth lab. For this reason, Gus orchestrated the assassination attempt with Nacho.
 Giancarlo Esposito as Gus Fring, an Albuquerque narcotics distributor for Eladio's cartel who uses his fried chicken chain Los Pollos Hermanos as a front.

Recurring 
 Ed Begley Jr. as Clifford Main, founding partner of Davis & Main Attorneys at Law, who is working with Howard on the Sandpiper case.
 Mark Margolis as Hector Salamanca, a once-brutal drug dealer and cartel enforcer who suffered a stroke and is unable to walk or speak.
 Daniel and Luis Moncada as Leonel and Marco Salamanca, twin hitmen for the Juárez Cartel and nephews of Hector.
 Ray Campbell as Tyrus Kitt, one of Gus's henchmen.
 Javier Grajeda as Juan Bolsa, a Juárez drug cartel underboss.
 Jeremiah Bitsui as Victor, one of Gus's henchmen.
 Juan Carlos Cantu as Manuel Varga, Nacho's father, who owns an upholstery shop.
 Peter Diseth as Bill Oakley, a deputy district attorney.
 Harrison Thomas as Lyle, the assistant manager of the Los Pollos Hermanos branch in Albuquerque.
 Jessie Ennis as Erin Brill, a lawyer at Davis & Main.
 Tina Parker as Francesca Liddy, Saul's secretary.
 Lennie Loftin as Genidowski, a con man hired by Jimmy and Kim to pose as Howard's private investigator.
 Josh Fadem as Joey Dixon/Marshall, a UNM film teacher who helps Jimmy on various projects and schemes.
 Hayley Holmes as Make-up Girl/Drama Girl/Cheri, a UNM film student.
 Julian Bonfiglio as Sound Guy/Phil, a UNM film student.
 Sandrine Holt as Cheryl Hamlin, Howard's estranged wife.
 John Posey as Rand Casimiro, a retired judge who is mediating the Sandpiper case.
 John Ennis as Lenny, a grocery store employee hired by Jimmy and Kim to impersonate Casimiro.
 Dennis Boutsikaris as Rich Schweikart, founding partner of the Scweikart and Cokely law firm.
 Bryan Cranston as Walter White, a middle-aged high school chemistry teacher who, during the events of Breaking Bad, becomes involved with the drug trade and enlists Saul to help launder his money, appears in flashbacks. 
 Aaron Paul as Jesse Pinkman, a former student of Walter's who, during the events of Breaking Bad, works with him to produce and sell meth, appears in flashbacks.
 Pat Healy as Jeff, a cab driver who recognizes Gene as Saul Goodman. Healy replaced Don Harvey, who was unable to reprise his role due to another filming commitment.
 Max Bickelhaup as Buddy, Jeff's friend and partner in crime.
 Carol Burnett as Marion, Jeff's mother who takes a liking to Gene.

Guests 
 Julie Ann Emery and Jeremy Shamos as Betsy and Craig Kettleman, a married couple whom Jimmy, and later Kim, represented during an embezzlement case, and who attempted to extort Jimmy. Since Craig's release from prison they have operated a shady tax preparation service.
 Rex Linn as Kevin Wachtell, CEO of Mesa Verde Bank & Trust.
 Lavell Crawford as Huell Babineaux, professional pickpocket and Jimmy's bodyguard and fixer.
 Julie Pearl as Suzanne Ericsen, an assistant district attorney.
 Eileen Fogarty as Mrs. Nguyen, owner of a nail salon that houses Jimmy's law office in its utility room.
 Julia Minesci as Wendy, a street prostitute working out of the Crossroads motel, reprising her role from Breaking Bad.
 David Ury as Spooge, a small-time criminal, reprising his role from Breaking Bad.
 Keiko Agena as Viola Goto, Kim Wexler's former paralegal.
 Andrea Sooch as Margarethe Ziegler, Werner Ziegler's widow.
 Kerry Condon as Stacey Ehrmantraut, Mike's widowed daughter-in-law and the mother of Kaylee Ehrmantraut.
 Joe DeRosa as Dr. Caldera, a veterinarian who serves as Mike and Jimmy's liaison to the criminal underworld.
 Stefan Kapičić as Casper, a member of Werner's construction crew.
 Kirk Bovill as Mr. Ryman, a seemingly innocent suburbanite who works for Gus Fring.
 Joni Bovill as Mrs. Ryman, a seemingly innocent suburbanite who works for Gus Fring.
 Jean Effron as Irene Landry, Jimmy's former elder law client who represents the class in the Sandpiper lawsuit.
 Steven Bauer as Don Eladio Vuente, head of the cartel.
 Reed Diamond as David, a sommelier at a prestigious restaurant and Fring's frequent confidante.
 Jim O'Heir as Frank, a security guard at Cottonwood Mall whom Gene befriends.
 Devin Ratray as Alfred Hawthorne Hill, a boorish man who falls victim to Gene's identity theft scam.
 Kevin Sussman as Mr. Lingk, a man with cancer who is targeted for a scam by Gene.
 John Koyama as Emilio Koyama, Jesse's future partner in the drug business during the events of Breaking Bad.
 Betsy Brandt as Marie Schrader, Hank Schrader's widow. She appears as a witness against Saul Goodman when he is finally arrested and attends Saul's trial.
 Michael McKean as Chuck McGill, Jimmy's deceased brother and partner at Hamlin, Hamlin & McGill, appears in a flashback.

Production

Development 

In January 2020, AMC renewed Better Call Saul for a sixth and final season. Showrunner Peter Gould and AMC representatives confirmed it would consist of 13 episodes, higher than the usual 10. This brought the series' total episode count to 63, one more than its predecessor Breaking Bad. Gould stated, "From the beginning when we started this, I think all our hopes and dreams were to be able to tell the whole story... and make it to be a complete story from beginning to end... We're going to try like hell to stick the landing of these 63 episodes." Giancarlo Esposito had previously speculated in April 2019 that the series would end with a sixth season because it was the "comfortable way" to do so, similar to how Breaking Bad fifth and final season was split into two halves, giving the feeling that the latter half was the sixth season. Gould said he initially doubted how he could do 13 episodes because the 10-episode count of previous seasons proved physically exhausting for him, but executive producer and writer Thomas Schnauz convinced him to go for 13, saying, "You'll know it's the last 13 so you'll see the barn in the distance. You'll be like the horse that gallops down the last bit."

Writing 
In February 2020, Gould suggested the sixth season would explore Saul Goodman's flashforwards as Gene Takavic to a greater extent than previous seasons. By April 2020, scripting for the season had already begun. Gould did not want the season to be anticlimactic, so, to deliver a satisfactory conclusion to Better Call Saul, he brought co-creator Vince Gilligan, who also created Breaking Bad, back to the writer's room "for a good chunk of the season". Gilligan had not been involved in the writers' room since early in season three. By December 2020, scripting was still not complete, with Gould saying the writers having to communicate through Zoom, rather than in person, was like "trying to dance in quick sand".

Gould later said the season would explore if there was any way for Saul to earn redemption after his criminal activities throughout the series. During filming of the season, series star Bob Odenkirk said that Gould told him that "when Better Call Saul is done it will shed new light... you will see Breaking Bad and the story of Breaking Bad in a different way", comparing to its final season where Gilligan had "start[ed] knocking things down and start[ed] lighting fires and burning everything down".

Casting 

Laura Fraser confirmed after the premiere date announcement that she was unable to reprise her role as Lydia Rodarte-Quayle for the final season. This was due to COVID-19 restrictions preventing travel between the United States and Scotland, where she lived when the final season began filming. Prior to the season premiere, it was announced that Bryan Cranston and Aaron Paul would reprise their roles from Breaking Bad for the final season as Walter White and Jesse Pinkman, respectively. 

During the mid-season break, it was announced that the latter half of the season would feature Carol Burnett in the role of Marion, although details about the character were not disclosed. It was also revealed that the character of Jeff, the cab driver who recognized Saul in Omaha, had been recast from Don Harvey to Pat Healy. Fans theorized this was due to Harvey's filming commitments on We Own This City. Harvey later expressed disappointment in not being able to reprise the role due to scheduling conflicts, but praised Healy for making the character his own.

Filming

COVID-19 delays 
In April 2020, Michael Mando and Tony Dalton separately said filming was scheduled to begin that September, but both were unsure if it would be delayed due to the ongoing COVID-19 pandemic. Rhea Seehorn said in July that filming would not begin until it was safe to do so. In August, producer Mark Johnson said the pandemic could limit where the series films by eschewing specific indoor locations: "Like a lot of other people, we're going to have to be very creative in where and how we shoot[...] A lot of places just won't let you in[...] We don't want everything to be a chamber piece". In the same month, Gould said filming was unlikely to start in 2020 due to the pandemic, adding that while Sony Pictures Television was doing "everything humanly" possible for the series to resume filming safely, "I think we are probably going to delay a little bit unfortunately." In October, Esposito said filming would begin in March 2021, which was echoed by Odenkirk in February 2021.

Filming officially began on March 10, 2021, in New Mexico. Each episode was expected to take about three weeks to film, a longer filming schedule compared to previous seasons, where a typical episode was filmed in nine days. Cranston and Paul were flown in to Albuquerque and filmed their scenes in April 2021.  Their roles were kept in absolutely secrecy, with both actors kept out of sight when not on set, similar to Cranston's cameo in El Camino: A Breaking Bad Movie. They stayed in Alburquerque for four days at an Airbnb, with all wardrobe and makeup done in the home and only leaving to be taken on site to shoot. They appeared in one scene together as well as one individual scene each. The Cinnabon scenes in Better Call Saul are set in Omaha, but are filmed at the Cottonwood Mall in Albuquerque, New Mexico. Production was predicted to last roughly eight months, but filming instead wrapped after eleven months on February 9, 2022. 

Additional filming was done in March 2022, after principal photography for the series ended, for the opening teaser of "Point and Shoot". With several crew members but no cast members on hand, the scene was filmed in Leo Carrillo State Beach, California. This was the only time the series was filmed outside of New Mexico.

Odenkirk's on-set collapse 

On July 27, 2021, after filming a "Point and Shoot" scene for twelve hours, Odenkirk was riding his exercise bike when he suffered a heart attack. Seehorn, Fabian, and Dalton were nearby and immediately called for help upon seeing him collapse. The shows health safety supervisor Rosa Estrada and Assistant Director Angie Meyer administered CPR and deployed an automated defibrillator; it took three attempts for his pulse to return. Odenkirk was rushed to Presbyterian Hospital, where two stents were put in his body to relieve plaque buildup. Odenkirk was treated without further surgery and took a five-week break from filming, requiring production to make accommodating schedule changes. In mid-August, Dalton said scenes not involving Odenkirk were being filmed, but Odenkirk had not yet been given clearance to return. Odenkirk confirmed by early September 2021 that he was back on set filming.

Averted IATSE strike 
In October 2021, a potential strike by the International Alliance of Theatrical Stage Employees (IATSE) would have resulted in all productions in the New Mexico film and television industry shutting down, including Better Call Saul. Odenkirk, Gould, New Mexico Governor Michelle Lujan Grisham and several members of the New Mexico state legislature voiced their support for the IATSE and for creating better working conditions for the unionized crew members. On October 16, 2021, a tentative agreement was made before the deadline between the IATSE and the Alliance of Motion Picture and Television Producers, temporarily averting a strike. The contract was ratified by the IATSE members on November 15, 2021, ending all prospects of a strike and allowing production to continue without interruption.

Episodes

Broadcast 
When the sixth season was ordered by AMC in January 2020, it was scheduled to premiere in 2021. However, in April 2020, Gilligan said that would depend on whether the cast and crew would be able to film in 2020 due to the COVID-19 pandemic. In February 2021, AMC confirmed that the sixth season would likely premiere in the first quarter of 2022. Gould's preference was to have all 13 episodes of the sixth season aired weekly and not for the season to be split in any manner; however, he noted that only AMC would decide the scheduling. 

Variety reported on November 4, 2021, that the season would air over two halves, which was confirmed on the official announcement date on February 10, 2022.  Gould said the writers did not know the season would be split into two parts until AMC announced it. The first seven episodes began airing on April 18, 2022; fans who attended PaleyFest in Los Angeles on April 9, 2022 received an early screening of the season premiere. The last six episodes aired starting airing July 11, 2022; fans who attended Tribeca Festival in New York on June 18, 2022 received an early screening of the mid-season premiere.

The seven-week break between both halves was shorter compared to the split final season of Breaking Bad, where the two halves aired a year apart. Splitting the season in two allowed the show to nominate each half of the season for different Emmy Awards ceremonies, as the first half was eligible for the 74th Primetime Emmy Awards in 2022, while eligibility for the next year's ceremony began in June.

Each episode would air on AMC at 9:00 pm (ET) on Mondays, with the first two episodes premiering back-to-back on the same night. During the season's run, each episode would be available to stream the day they premiered on AMC+, AMC's streaming service which first launched in June 2020. The season premiere resulted in the biggest day of new subscriber sign-ups for AMC+, and by the mid-season finale episodic viewership on the streaming service rose by 61%. Upon the release of the series finale, the app experienced an outage, causing many users to be logged out. AMC later reported that first-day viewing numbers for the finale on AMC+ was four times as big as the season premiere, and called the series' final season the highest acquisition driver in the history of the streaming service.

In certain international markets, like previous seasons, episodes were released on Netflix and other streaming services the day after their broadcast on AMC.

Reception

Critical response 

The sixth season of Better Call Saul has received universal acclaim. On Rotten Tomatoes, the season has an approval rating of 99% based on 179 reviews, with an average rating of 9.4/10. The website's critical consensus reads, "Better Call Saul remains as masterfully in control as Jimmy McGill keeps insisting he is in this final season, where years of simmering storytelling come to a scintillating boil." On Metacritic, the season has a score of 94 out of 100 based on 20 critics, indicating "universal acclaim".

After the airing of the series finale, Stuart Jeffries of The Guardian said that the series had surprisingly surpassed its predecessor in quality, saying: "Over six series, Better Call Saul evolved into a more profound and beautiful drama about human corruption than its predecessor. It mutated into something visually more sumptuous than Breaking Bad, while never, for a moment, losing its verbal dexterity and moral compass". Craig Elvy of Screen Rant also opined that the series was better than its predecessor, saying: "Jimmy McGill's spinoff leaves a very familiar legacy – sustained and enthusiastic praise from audiences and critics, capped by an ending that satisfies across the board." He went on to say: "When Better Call Saul began, many would've hoped the spinoff could either escape Breaking Bads shadow, or somehow enhance Walt and Jesse's story with illuminating new details. Few dared dream Better Call Saul would achieve both, and the sheer ambition to create a spinoff that wholly embraces its predecessor whilst also existing in a totally different realm exemplifies why Better Call Saul has an ever-so-slight edge over Breaking Bad." Jeremy Urquhart of Collider made a comparison between the quality of both series’, saying: "Breaking Bad succeeds as a crime-thriller tragedy with a fast-paced plot, and Better Call Saul works as a slower-paced, character-focused drama (with some dark comedy)". He said his list "doesn't aim to argue that one is better than the other. It's a matter of personal preference, but it's hard to deny that there are certain things Better Call Saul  does better, but also some areas where it isn't quite as great as its parent show."

Part 1 
The two-episode premiere "Wine and Roses" and "Carrot and Stick" received positive reviews from critics. David Segal of The New York Times described the first episode as "strong, twisty and gripping" and said the writing "must be hailed as a masterly curtain raiser, one that managed to pick up the story right where it was left, two years ago, and hurl it forward at a promising pace." Segal criticized Kim's con against Howard at the country club, calling it "dimmer and daffier than the rest of the show" and "pointlessly cruel". Reviewing both "Wine and Roses" and "Carrot and Stick" together, The A.V. Clubs Kimberly Potts graded them with an "A" and gave positive notes to Gould's screenplay and the performances of the cast, especially those of Rhea Seehorn as Kim and Michael Mando as Nacho. Steve Greene, writing for IndieWire, said the first two episodes were "astonishingly short on false moves so far". He also noted Ed Begley Jr.'s acting as Clifford Main and the symbolism in Kim throwing away the "World's 2nd Best Lawyer" coffee mug, calling it "a poetic bookend of sorts." David Segal of The New York Times described the second episode as "superb and stressful" and said it was a "study in damage control, overseen by a man [Gus] who seems uncharacteristically ruffled and uncertain about what to do." Segal also said the shootout scene was "expertly staged" by Gilligan and that Rhea Seehorn's performance as Kim provided an opportunity for her to "demonstrate an almost thuggish toughness." Scott Tobias, writing for Vulture, compared the motel sequences to the Spaghetti Westerns of Sergio Leone, including Once Upon a Time in the West (1968). He also gave positive notes to the level of detail in the episode's opening scene, calling it "one big reason Better Call Saul stands apart from other shows."

The third episode "Rock and Hard Place", which concluded Nacho's arc, received acclaim by critics. Kaleena Rivera of Pajiba praised Michael Mando's display of rage and the episode's buildup to the ending. The A.V. Clubs Kimberly Potts said Mando's acting was deserving of an Emmy nomination. She also compared Nacho's last words to Walter White's confession to Jesse Pinkman in the Breaking Bad episode "Ozymandias" and gave positive notes to the performances of Giancarlo Esposito and Mark Margolis and the show's development of Nacho as a compelling character. David Segal of The New York Times saluted Smith's screenplay and direction and the production design. He similarly compared Nacho's life to that of Jesse's—both criminals who made "some terrible life choices" and were "over-punished for them"—adding, "It would have been great to see more of this stellar actor, but if you must leave a show, a more dramatic and affecting end is hard to imagine."

The mid-season finale "Plan and Execution", which showcased the culmination of Saul and Kim’s plot to ruin Howard’s career and reputation, received acclaim, particularly for Patrick Fabian's performance. Scott Tobias of Vulture and Nick Harley of Den of Geek shared five out of five ratings for the episode, while Kimberly Potts from The A.V. Club and Steve Greene from IndieWire both gave the episode an "A" grade.

Part 2 
The mid-season premiere "Point and Shoot", which concluded Lalo's arc, was met with critical acclaim. It received five out of five stars from The Guardians Stuart Jeffries and The Timess James Jackson, four out of five stars from Scott Tobias of Vulture, Nick Harley of Den of Geek, and Ed Power of The Daily Telegraph, and "A" grades from The A.V. Clubs Kimberly Potts, IndieWires Steve Greene, and Entertainment Weeklys Darren Franich.

The series finale "Saul Gone" received critical acclaim. Giving the episode an A grade, Kimberly Potts of The A.V. Club called it a "supremely satisfying sendoff" with "blasts from the past and one last twist". At IGN, Rafael Motamayor gave the episode a 10 out of 10 rating, describing it as a "subtler character study, exploring regrets and change in its protagonist". He also noted the episode title and complimented it for being "a thematic bookend on a show that was never really about Saul Goodman" and highlighted the motif of time machines. Similarly, Vultures Jen Chaney also discussed the motif of time machines in the episode, and commended it for offering more depth and context to Breaking Bad, and felt the series was superior to Breaking Bad, as it "dared to widen its scope and go bigger than Breaking Bad ever did". In addition, the website's Scott Tobias gave it a 5 out of 5 rating and wrote, "'Saul Gone' [...] finds an ending for Jimmy that's hopeful and authentic without feeling rosy or unearned."

Critics' top ten list

Ratings

Accolades

Home media 
The sixth season was released on Blu-ray and DVD in region 1 on December 6, 2022; bonus features includes cast and crew audio commentaries on every episode, deleted scenes, outtakes, and various behind-the-scenes featurettes.

Related media

American Greed: James McGill 
On April 1, 2022, a few weeks before the season premiere, the CNBC Prime YouTube account uploaded American Greed: James McGill. Written by Peter Gould's assistant Valerie Chu, the ten-minute short is a mockumentary done in the style of the documentary series American Greed and recaps the events of both Breaking Bad and Better Call Saul. Narrated by Stacy Keach, the mockumentary has interviews of several recurring Better Call Saul characters, including DA Suzanne Ericsen (Julie Pearl), Deputy DA Bill Oakley (Peter Diseth), and Kim Wexler's former boss Rich Schweikart (Dennis Boutsikaris). Also making reappearances are Betsy and Craig Kettleman (Julie Ann Emery and Jeremy Shamos, respectively), who had not appeared on the series since the first season, but made additional canonical appearances in the short film No Picnic, which was released after the third season, and on the Inside the Gilliverse podcast in 2020. The short film was shot in Albuquerque in March 2022, a year after Emery and Shamos filmed the Better Call Saul episode "Carrot and Stick".

Talking Saul 

Talking Saul made its return for Better Call Sauls sixth season, and aired following the mid-season finale as well as for the series' penultimate episode. Guests included Peter Gould, Bob Odenkirk, Rhea Seehorn and Patrick Fabian for the first episode, and Vince Gilligan, Peter Gould, Bob Odenkirk; and Rhea Seehorn (via satellite) for the second episode. The show had been off the air since after Better Call Sauls third season.

Slippin' Jimmy 

Variety reported in March 2021 that AMC was developing an animated spinoff series, Slippin' Jimmy. The series was later revealed as a short-form series; a six-part animated series to be released online during the sixth season of Better Call Saul. Each episode is inspired by a specific film genre — from spaghetti Westerns and Buster Keaton to The Exorcist. The series was produced by Rick and Morty animators Starburns and written by Better Call Saul writers Ariel Levine and Kathleen Williams-Foshee. Voice actors include Chi McBride, Laraine Newman, and Sean Giambrone as Jimmy. Six episodes of Slippin' Jimmy, each around 8–9 minutes in length, were released on AMC+ on May 23, 2022. 

The series received negative reviews from fans and critics for its stark drop in quality compared to its predecessors. Mark Donaldson from Screen Rant criticized the concept, saying "the animated spinoff is being sold as a digital exclusive but this race to provide sellable content to audiences undermines storytelling ... the team behind both Breaking Bad and Better Call Saul have proven themselves to be savvy storytellers that respect the journeys of their characters over cheap cash-ins. It's this integrity that makes Slippin Jimmy feel like such a misstep."

Filmmaker Training 
For the sixth season, new episodes of the Better Call Saul Employee Training Video series, which had begun with the show's third season, were announced.

The employee videos released during the season were titled Filmmaker Training and premiered on July 11, 2022. The series consists of six episodes and focuses on the film crew that worked with Jimmy on his advertisements.

Notes

References

External links 
  – official site
 
 

2022 American television seasons
Season 6
Television productions postponed due to the COVID-19 pandemic
Split television seasons